Daniel Kutner (born 1959, Buenos Aires) was the Israeli Ambassador to Spain and Andorra between 2015 and 2019. Between September 2008 and August 2012, Kutner was Consul General to the United States, based in Philadelphia.

Kutner earned an M.A. in History of the Muslim Countries from the Hebrew University of Jerusalem in 1986. In 2005, he earned an M.A. in Political Science/National Security Studies at the University of Haifa and graduated from the National Security College.

References

Israeli consuls
Ambassadors of Israel to Andorra
Ambassadors of Israel to Spain
Living people
1959 births
Date of birth missing (living people)
People from Buenos Aires
Argentine emigrants to Israel
Hebrew University of Jerusalem alumni
University of Haifa alumni